John Lloyd Stephens (November 28, 1805October 13, 1852) was an American explorer, writer, and diplomat. Stephens was a pivotal figure in the rediscovery of Maya civilization throughout Middle America and in the planning of the Panama railroad.

Early life
John Lloyd Stephens was born November 28, 1805, in the township of Shrewsbury, New Jersey. He was the second son of Benjamin Stephens, a successful New Jersey merchant, and Clemence Lloyd, daughter of an eminent local judge. The following year the family moved to New York City. There Stephens received an education in the Classics at two privately tutored schools. At the age of 13 he enrolled at Columbia College, graduating at the top of his class four years later in 1822.

After studying law with an attorney for a year, he attended the  Litchfield Law School. He passed the bar exam after completing his course of study, and practiced in New York City.

Stephens embarked on a journey through Europe in 1834, and went on to Egypt and the Levant, returning home in 1836. He later wrote several popular books about his travels and explorations.

In 1841, Stephens was elected to the American Philosophical Society.

Politics
He was recommended for the post of Minister to the Netherlands in 1837, but Martin Van Buren nominated Harmanus Bleecker, who served until 1842.

In 1846 Stephens was a delegate to the state constitutional convention, where he was responsible for the introduction and adoption of a conciliation court (small claims court).

Mesoamerican studies
Stephens read with interest early accounts of ruined cities of Mesoamerica by such writers and explorers as Alexander von Humboldt and Juan Galindo.

In 1839, President Martin Van Buren commissioned Stephens as Special Ambassador to Central America. While there, the government of the Federal Republic of Central America fell apart, in a civil war. He later published an account of the events he witnessed in Central America, Incidents of Travel in Central America, Chiapas and Yucatán.

Stephens and his travelling companion, architect and draftsman Frederick Catherwood first came across Maya ruins at Copán, having landed in British Honduras (now Belize). They were astonished at their findings and spent two weeks mapping the site. Stephens surmised that it must have been built by some long-forgotten people, as he could not imagine it was the native Mayans; however, Catherwood noted the facial resemblance to modern Mayans. Stephens was actually able to buy the city of Copan for a sum of $50 and had dreams of floating it down the river and into museums in the United States.

They went on to Palenque, Quiriguá and Uxmal. They reached Palenque on May 11, 1840, and left in early June. While there, they documented the Temple of the Inscriptions, the Temple of the Cross, the Temple of the Sun and the Temple of the Foliated Cross.

They continued investigating Maya ruins with a return trip to Yucatán in October 1841. According to Stephens's book about the trip, they visited a total of 44 Mayan sites such as Mayapan, Uxmal, Kabah, the gateway at Labná, Sayil, Xtampak, Chichen Itza, Tulum, and Izamal. In Uxmal, they documented the Governor's House, the Nunnery Quadrangle and the Pyramid of the Magician. Catherwood also drew a famous view of the well at Bolonchén.

Catherwood's drawings and lithographs showed, without question, the Maya to have been the authors of some of the most artistic and intellectual works of pre-Columbian America. Besides large constructions, they produced works of artistic refinement such as stone and plaster sculptures, frescoes, painted pottery and bas-reliefs in wood. As a result of their explorations, Stephens and Catherwood argued convincingly that the Mayans built the ancient Central American cities in contrast to the theory that ethnic groups from European or Asian civilizations had built them.

Stephens's books served to inspire Edgar Allan Poe, who reviewed three of Stephens's books for the New York Review and Graham's Magazine.

Panama Railroad Company

At the time England enjoyed a monopoly over the ocean navigation to and from the United States. Stephens obtained a charter from the state of New York, and incorporated the Ocean Steam Navigation Company. The company acquired two steam ships, the Washington and the Hermann which made journeys to Europe.

When the Panama Railroad Company was founded in 1849, Stephens was chosen to be Vice President. He visited Panama and New Granada to make arrangements for the laying of the railroad. On his way to Bogotá, the capital of New Granada, he fell off his mule and sustained severe injuries from which he never fully recovered. He returned to the United States, and was appointed President of the railroad. While in Panama, he was struck down by malaria in the spring of 1852.  He recovered sufficiently to return to New York, only to have a recurrence of the disease. He died October 13, 1852. He was buried at New York City Marble Cemetery.

Stephens is the subject of the following works: Maya Explorer by Victor Wolfgang von Hagen, first published in 1947, and Jungle of Stone by William Carlsen (2016).

Bibliography
 Incidents of Travel in Egypt, Arabia Petraea, and the Holy Land (1837)
 Incidents of Travel in Greece, Turkey, Russia and Poland (1838)
 Incidents of Travel in Central America, Chiapas and Yucatán, Vols. 1 & 2 (1841) (Reissued by Cambridge University Press, 2010. )
 Incidents of Travel in Yucatán, Vols. 1 & 2 (1843)

Notes

References

 Cabañas, Miguel A. (2008). "Chapter One: Putting the World in Order: John Lloyd Stephens’s Narration of America." The Cultural “Other” in Nineteenth-Century Travel Narratives: How the United States and Latin America Described Each Other. Lewiston, NY: Edwin Mellen Press.
 
 
 Hay, John (2017). "The American Holy Land: John Lloyd Stephens's Mayan Excursions." Postapocalyptic Fantasies in Antebellum American Literature. New York: Cambridge University Press. 154-165.
 
 
 
 Carlsen, William (2016) Jungle of Stone: the true story of two men, their extraordinary journey, and the discovery of the lost civilization of the Maya

External links
 

John Lloyd Stephens, a biography.
Guide to the John Lloyd Stephens at The Bancroft Library
Reed College website including all the illustrations of Uxmal, Kabah, Sayil, and Labná in Stephens's 1841 Incidents of Travel in Central America and in Stephens and Catherwood's 1843 Incidents of Travel in Yucatán.
 
 
 
 Works by John Lloyd Stephens at Google Books

1805 births
1852 deaths
19th-century explorers
American explorers
Explorers of Central America
Mayanists
American Mesoamericanists
Mesoamerican archaeologists
19th-century Mesoamericanists
Columbia College (New York) alumni
Litchfield Law School alumni
Burials at New York City Marble Cemetery
People from Shrewsbury, New Jersey
Infectious disease deaths in New York (state)
Deaths from malaria